Coluber constrictor etheridgei, commonly known as the tan racer, is a subspecies of nonvenomous snake in the family Colubridae, a subspecies of the eastern racer (Coluber constrictor). The subspecies is native to the southern United States.

Geographic range
C. c. etheridgei is found in west-central Louisiana and adjacent eastern Texas.

Etymology
The subspecific name or epithet, etheridgei, is in honor of the American herpetologist Richard Emmett Etheridge.

Description
The tan racer, as its name implies, is typically a solid tan in color. Juveniles have a pattern of dark brown dorsal blotches, which fade to solid tan at about a year of age. The underside is typically gray or white, sometimes with yellow spotting. It typically grows from .75 – 1.5 m (30 to 60 inches) in total length (including tail). It has large eyes, with round pupils, and excellent vision.

Behavior
Like all racers, the tan racer is diurnal and highly active. Its diet consists of a wide variety of prey, but primarily includes rodents, and lizards. It is fast moving, and generally seeks to use its speed to escape if approached.

Habitat
The tan racer prefers habitats of pine flatwoods.

Reproduction
C. c. etheridgei is oviparous. Mating occurs in the spring, and a clutch of approximately 30 eggs is laid typically in the month of May, to hatch mid summer.

References

External links

Herps of Texas: Coluber constrictor

Further reading
Behler JL, King FW (1979). The Audubon Society Field Guide to North American Reptiles and Amphibians. New York: Alfred A. Knopf. 743 pp., 657 color plates. . (Coluber constrictor etheridgei, p. 597).
Powell R, Conant R, Collins JT (2016). Peterson Field Guide to Reptiles and Amphibians of Eastern and Central North America, Fourth Edition. Boston and New York: Houghton Mifflin Harcourt. xiv + 494 pp., 47 plates, 207 figures. . (Coluber constrictor etheridgei, pp. 369–370).
Smith HM, Brodie ED Jr (1982). Reptiles of North America: A Guide to Field Identification. New York: Golden Press. 240 pp. . (Coluber constrictor etheridgei, p. 190).
Wilson LD (1970). "The racer Coluber constrictor (Serpentes: Colubridae) in Louisiana and eastern Texas". Texas Journal of Science 22 (1): 67–85. (Coluber constrictor etheridgei, new subspecies).

Colubrids
Endemic fauna of the United States
Reptiles of the United States
Fauna of the Southeastern United States